Algeria competed at the 2022 World Games held in Birmingham, United States from 7 to 17 July 2022. One athlete represented Algeria and he won one gold medal. The country finished in 47th place in the medal table.

Medalists

Competitors
The following is the list of number of competitors in the Games.

Karate

Algeria won one gold medal in karate.

Men

References

Nations at the 2022 World Games
2022
World Games